Horace E. Houghton (April 6, 1835 – August 25, 1897) was an American politician and lawyer.

Born in Alexander, Genesee County, New York, Houghton moved to East Troy, Wisconsin in 1857. In 1862, Houghton moved to Durand, Wisconsin. He served as district attorney for Pepin County, Wisconsin for eight years. In 1873, Houghton served in the Wisconsin State Assembly and was a Republican. Then, he served in the Wisconsin State Senate in 1879 and 1880. Houghton moved to Spokane, Washington Territory, 1884, and served as corporation counsel for the City of Spokane. In 1889 and 1897, Houghton served in the Washington State Senate. Houghton died in Augustana Hospital in Spokene, Washington after suffering a stroke.

Notes

1835 births
1897 deaths
People from Alexander, New York
People from Durand, Wisconsin
Politicians from Spokane, Washington
Washington (state) lawyers
District attorneys in Wisconsin
Washington (state) state senators
Republican Party Wisconsin state senators
Lawyers from Spokane, Washington
People from East Troy, Wisconsin
19th-century American politicians
19th-century American lawyers
Republican Party members of the Wisconsin State Assembly